Good Records is a record label formed by Tim DeLaughter, the lead singer of The Polyphonic Spree and the alternative-rock band  Tripping Daisy. It has its own record store in Dallas, Texas.

Artists 
 Tripping Daisy
 The Polyphonic Spree
 Pilotdrift
 Preteen Zenith
 Grandaddy
 My Name is Moses
 Philip E. Karnats
 Binary Sunrise
 Sweet Lee Morrow
 Burgess Meredith

See also 
 List of record labels

References

External links
 Official site

American record labels
Alternative rock record labels